Caloparyphus is a genus of flies in the family Stratiomyidae.

Species
Caloparyphus amplus (Coquillett, 1902)
Caloparyphus atriventris (Coquillett, 1902)
Caloparyphus crotchi (Osten Sacken, 1877)
Caloparyphus crucigerus (Coquillett, 1902)
Caloparyphus currani (James, 1939)
Caloparyphus decemmaculatus (Osten Sacken, 1886)
Caloparyphus flaviventris (James, 1936)
Caloparyphus greylockensis (Johnson, 1912)
Caloparyphus major (Hine, 1901)
Caloparyphus mariposa (James, 1939)
Caloparyphus palaearcticus Rozkošný, Hauser & Gelhaus, 2016
Caloparyphus pretiosus (Banks, 1920)
Caloparyphus tetraspilus (Loew, 1866)

References

Stratiomyidae
Brachycera genera
Diptera of North America
Diptera of Asia